The 1886–87 season was the first season of the club that was to become Arsenal.

The club was formed by David Danskin and other workers from the Royal Arsenal, Woolwich. Early games were played under the name Dial Square.

Home games were played on an area of Plumstead Common that is now bordered by Heavitree Road, Waverley Crescent and St John's Terrace. Players used The Star Inn public house in Jago Close as a dressing room.

The club's first match was against Eastern Wanderers on 11 December 1886. The match was played on a piece of scrap land in what is now Tiller Road on the Isle of Dogs.

In his book "Forward, Arsenal!", Bernard Joy gave the team line-up for first match as: Beardsley, Danskin, Porteous, Gregory, Bee, Wolfe, Smith, Moy, Whitehead, Morris, Duggan. However, in 1953 Robert Thompson claimed that he played in the first game (along with Wells in place of Morris and Duggan) and scored the first goal. Further, it has been found that Fred Beardsley played for Nottingham Forest in the F.A. Cup that day.

Thompson also claimed to have suggested the name Royal Arsenal. From Thompson's account, it appears that the first game played as Royal Arsenal was against Millwall Rovers on 5 February 1887.

Players

Players that were reported as having played for Dial Square / Royal Arsenal during the 1886–87 season include:
David Danskin (captain)
Fred Beardsley (vice-captain)
Joseph Bee
James Crichton
Robert Crichton
Charles Duggan
John Gellatly
Thomas Gregory
Alfred Morris
James Moy
Richard Pearce
Duncan Porteous
Richard Price
George Smith
Robert Thompson
Thomas Wells
G Whitehead
Frank Wolfe
Morris Bates

Club officials
Committee members
David Danskin
Fred Beardsley
Joseph Bee
Thomas Wells
Duncan Porteous
G Whitehead
George Smith
Thomas Gregory
Trainer: Morris Bates
Secretary: Elijah Watkins
Treasurer: Fred Beardsley

Jack Humble was probably involved with the club during the season.

Matches

Friendlies
All matches that Dial Square / Royal Arsenal played during the 1886–87 season were friendlies. Significant matches were:
 11 December 1886 v Eastern Wanderers (A) – the club's first-ever game
 8 January 1887 v Erith (H) – the club's first home game and the club's first game under the name Royal Arsenal
 5 February 1887 v Millwall Rovers (A)-First defeat

References

External links
 Arsenal season-by-season line-ups

Arsenal F.C. seasons
Royal Arsenal